Philodendron burle-marxii is a plant in the genus Philodendron native to South America from Colombia to Ecuador and Brazil. Named after the landscape architect Roberto Burle Marx, it is one of over 50 plants that bear his name. This aroid can climb, and has green cordate leaves with red stems.

References

burle-marxii
Flora of Brazil
Plants described in 1957